Earl Cooper (2 December 1886 Broken Bow, Nebraska – 22 October 1965 Atwater, California) was an American racecar driver.

Racing career
He began his racing career in 1908 in San Francisco in a borrowed car. He won the race, but lost his job as a mechanic after he beat one of his bosses, so he became a full-time racer. He joined the Stutz team in 1912. In 1913 he won seven of eight major races (and finished second in the other), and won the AAA National Championship. He was injured for the 1914 season. He missed the first several months of the 1915 season, but won the AAA championship anyhow. Cooper got another late start in 1916 after Stutz pulled out of racing, and he finished fifth in the championship. He won his third title in 1917 when the season was shortened by the outbreak of World War I, after which Cooper officially retired from full-time racing.

Cooper raced in the 1919 Indianapolis 500.

Cooper returned to replace Joe Thomas who broke his arm in October 1921, and won a  race at Fresno. He returned to racing full-time in 1922, and won five races in 1923.

Cooper raced in the 1924 Indianapolis 500, and was leading after . A tire blew, and he had to pit. He returned second, and worked his way back to the lead with  left in the race. He blew another tire just as he was passing Joe Boyer, and the pit stop forced him to settle for second. He started at Indy in 1925, and won the pole in his final Indy 500 in 1926. He retired for good in 1928.

Indianapolis 500 results

Awards
He was inducted in the Motorsports Hall of Fame of America in 2001.

References

External links
Biography
Indianapolis 500 statistics

1886 births
1965 deaths
Indianapolis 500 drivers
Indianapolis 500 polesitters
Sportspeople from Nebraska
People from Broken Bow, Nebraska
AAA Championship Car drivers
People from Atwater, California